Yanaoca is a town in southern Peru, capital of Canas Province in Cusco Region.

Populated places in the Cusco Region